The Showalter/Schowalter family originates from the Swiss village Strengelbach. The first known member, Hans Schonwalder, was mentioned in a 1566 record tax record. Later, the family converted to Anabaptism. Because of religious persecution and poverty, they migrated to Palatinate (Germany), Alsace (France) and from there to the U.S., where most of them live today, numbering over 10,000 people. The Showalter variant is only found in America today, with the vast majority living in the U.S. and a small number in Canada, while the Schowalter variant is found in the German state of Rhineland-Palatinate and the U.S.

Notable members 
Anthony Johnson Showalter (1858–1924), an American gospel music composer, teacher and publisher
Buck Showalter (born 1956), professional baseball player and manager
Dennis Showalter (1942–2019), American historian
Daniel Showalter (1830–1866), California miner and state legislator, duelist, secessionist, soldier for the Confederate States of America in Texas
Don Showalter, a professor and former chairman of the Department of Chemistry at the University of Wisconsin–Stevens Point
Elaine Showalter (born 1941), an American literary critic, feminist, and writer on cultural and social issues
Gena Showalter (born 1975), an American author in the genres of contemporary romance, paranormal romance and young adult
Jackson Showalter (1860–1935), a 5-time U.S. Chess Champion
Joseph Baltzell Showalter (1851–1932), a Republican member of the U.S. House of Representatives from Pennsylvania
Mark R. Showalter (born 1957), an American astronomer
Allen W. Showalter (born 1959) Served three terms as International President of the [Photo Marketing Association]
Max Showalter (1917–2000), an American film, television and stage actor
Michael Showalter (born 1970), an American actor, writer, and director and part of the sketch comedy trio Stella

See also
Showalter Field, formerly a country club, it was developed into an airpark  by brothers Howard and Sandy Showalter. Today it is a stadium in use by Winter Park High School.

References

Surnames
Surnames of German origin
Surnames of Swiss origin
German-language surnames
Swiss families